Jim Walsh (born October 26, 1956) is an American former professional ice hockey defenseman.  After playing hockey at Northeastern University, he played four games in the National Hockey League with the Buffalo Sabres in the 1981–82 season, recording one assist and four penalty minutes.

Walsh was born in Norfolk, Virginia and raised near Boston, Massachusetts.

Career statistics

Regular season and playoffs

External links
 

1956 births
Living people
American men's ice hockey defensemen
Binghamton Whalers players
Buffalo Sabres players
Ice hockey people from Virginia
Ice hockey people from Boston
New Haven Nighthawks players
Northeastern Huskies men's ice hockey players
Rochester Americans players
Saginaw Gears players
Sportspeople from Norfolk, Virginia
Undrafted National Hockey League players